Scott Henshall (born 15 November 1975) is a British fashion designer, philanthropist, TV personality and occasional fashion journalist.

Henshall was born in York, and raised in Hartlepool, he studied womenswear at Northumbria University. Such was his talent, he was fast tracked onto the second year and graduated the following year with first class honours.

Career

He burst onto the scene in 1998, when at the age of 22, he became the youngest designer to show at London Fashion Week.

In 2000, Henshall won the Vidal Sassoon Award for Cutting Edge Talent. Later that year, he was made Creative Director of luxury British fashion house Mulberry where The Times credited him for taking the Mulberry name into the 21st Century. Ransacking the archives, he produced luxurious jewel items and was responsible for their rebranding, advertising (Henshall chose Anna Friel as the face of Mulberry), fashion and accessory collections and for placing the brand on major celebrities, including Kate Winslet, Cameron Diaz and Dido, among others.

A world class designer, Henshall has collaborated with a number of global brands including Audi, Nokia, Sony, Liberty, Cath Kidston, Gossard and Laura Ashley, to name a few.

Henshall was hailed "King of the Red Carpet", after creating a series of iconic dresses. It started when he dressed supermodel Jodie Kidd in a web of lace for the first Spider-Man premiere.

In 2004, he attracted global media attention, after designing the World's Most Expensive Dress, a £5 million diamond-encrusted cobweb dress worn by Samantha Mumba at the 2004 premiere of Spider-Man 2.

He then went on to design both the World's Most Expensive Bikini, which was showcased by Sophie Anderton. He also designed the World's Most Expensive Football Boots, valued at £400,000, which were worn by Rio Ferdinand, Wayne Rooney and John Terry.

Scott created a 40-piece seasonal diffusion collection, titled Scotts by Scott Henshall. Originally stocked at Littlewoods, the collection ran for six seasons, before moving to New Look, where it ran for a further four seasons and had sold out in its first week.

I'm a Celebrity... Get Me Out of Here!
In 2006, Henshall appeared in the reality TV show I'm a Celebrity...Get Me Out of Here!. He was voted out of the programme by viewers on 24 November 2006, the second to leave.

Some of Henshall's attempts at the bushtucker trials were not successful. On one trial he was required to dance continually for five songs to earn ten stars, but surrendered after earning only one star. In an underwater trial called What Lurks Beneath, he again surrendered after only collecting one star.

At his post-eviction interview which was televised on 25 November 2006, Henshall continued his on-going spat with Footballers' Wives star Phina Oruche. He accused her of being the "least famous person on the show" and also said "she wanted to play the diva part. It's just a shame she didn't have the body or the face to live up to it" before pausing and adding "or the intelligence."

Personal life
Henshall is openly gay. Henshall achieved his Art GCSE with a grade 'A' at age of 12 and has 9 Blue Peter badges.

His charity work has included working with Global Cool and The Princes Trust.

Television appearances

I'm a Celebrity...Get Me Out of Here! (British series 6)

Tonight with Trevor MacDonald

The Weakest Link (Winner, Celebrity/Fashion special)

Ready Steady Cook (Winner of Celebrity special)

Loose Women

Paris Hilton's British Best Friend

Britain's Next Top Model (Guest judge)

Make Me a Supermodel (Guest judge)

Project Catwalk (Guest judge)

The Clothes Show

WAGs Boutique

Dancing on Ice Defrosted

References

1975 births
People from Hartlepool
LGBT fashion designers
English LGBT people
Living people
English fashion designers
I'm a Celebrity...Get Me Out of Here! (British TV series) participants